A list of books and essays about Howard Hawks:

Hawks